The 2022 Barranquilla Open is a professional tennis tournament played on outdoor hard courts. It is the first edition of the tournament which is part of the 2022 ITF Women's World Tennis Tour. It takes place in Barranquilla, Colombia between 31 October and 6 November 2022.

Champions

Singles

  Panna Udvardy def.  Laura Pigossi, 6–2, 7–5

Doubles

  Tímea Babos /  Kateryna Volodko def.  Carolina Alves /  Valeriya Strakhova, 3–6, 7–5, [10–7]

Singles main draw entrants

Seeds

 1 Rankings are as of 24 October 2022.

Other entrants
The following players received wildcards into the singles main draw:
  Yuliana Monroy
  Laura Pigossi
  Gabriella Price
  María Camila Torres Murcia
  Kelly Loana Vargas González

The following players received entry from the qualifying draw:
  Madison Bourguignon
  Ana Candiotto
  Lya Fernández
  Rebeca Pereira
  Lauren Proctor
  Kaitlin Quevedo
  Johanne Svendsen
  Angelina Wirges

The following player received entry as a lucky loser:
  Ana María Becerra

References

External links
 2022 Barranquilla Open at ITFtennis.com

2022 ITF Women's World Tennis Tour
2022 in Colombian sport
October 2022 sports events in Colombia
November 2022 sports events in Colombia